Mueang Chumphon is the capital district (amphoe mueang) of Chumphon province, southern Thailand.

Geography
Neighboring districts are (from the south clockwise) Sawi of Chumphon Province, Kra Buri of Ranong province, Tha Sae and Pathio of Chumphon Province.

History
On 29 April 1917 the district's name was changed from Mueang to Tha Tapao (ท่าตะเภา). On 14 November 1938 it was renamed Mueang Chumphon.

Administration
The district is divided into 17 sub-districts (tambons), which are further subdivided into 165 villages (mubans). Chumphon is a town (thesaban mueang) which covers the whole tambon Tha Taphao and parts of tambon Bang Mak, Na Thung, Tak Daet, Khun Krathing, and Wang Phai. There are a further three townships (thesaban tambons): Paknam Chumphon covers parts of tambon Paknam, Tha Yang the whole tambon Tha Yang, and Wang Phai parts of tambon Wang Phai. There are a further 16 tambon administrative organization.

References

External links
amphoe.com

Districts of Chumphon province